Carbonate Mountain may refer to:

 Carbonate Mountain (Colorado) in Colorado, USA
 Carbonate Mountain (Idaho) in Idaho, USA
 Carbonate Mountain (Montana) in Montana, USA